Zubeen Garg (born Zubeen Borthakur; 18 November 1972)  is an Indian singer, music director, composer, lyricist, music producer, actor, film director, film producer, script writer and philanthropist. He primarily works for and sings in the Assamese, Bengali and Hindi-language film and music industries, but has sung in many other languages and dialects, including Bishnupriya Manipuri, Boro, English, Goalpariya, Kannada, Karbi, Khasi, Malayalam, Marathi, Mising, Nepali, Odia, Sanskrit, Sindhi, Tamil, Telugu, Tiwa. He is also an instrumentalist and plays 12 instruments including Ananda Lohori, dhol, dotara, drums, guitar, harmonica, harmonium, mandolin, keyboard, tabla and various percussion instruments. He is Assam's highest-paid singer.

In 2011, Zubeen Garg was honoured as a guest artist of the year by the Assam Convention, at Oakbrook in Chicago, United States.

Early life
Garg was born in a Brahmin family at Tura, Meghalaya to Mohini Mohon Borthakur and Late Ily Borthakur. He was named after the music composer Zubin Mehta and used his gotra 'Garg''' as his surname. His father Mohini Borthakur was a Magistrate, and is a lyricist and a poet under the name Kapil Thakur and his mother Late Ily Borthakur was a singer. 

Garg's younger sister Jonkey Borthakur was an actress and singer who died in a car accident in February 2002 in Sonitpur district while they were going to perform stage show along with her co-artists. He had released the album Xixhu in 2002, in the memory of Jonkey Borthakur. His another sister is Dr. Palme Borthakur.

Garg pursued a degree in Bachelor of Science in B. Borooah College but dropped out to concentrate in his singing career.

Garg married Garima Saikia, a fashion designer from Golaghat, Assam on 4 February 2002.

Starting of musical life
Garg started to sing from the age of three. His first guru was his mother from where he learnt to sing and then he learnt tabla from Pandit Robin Banerjee for 11 years. Guru Ramani Rai acquainted him with Assamese folk. Garg was composing songs from his school days and used to give to singers to sing.

Singing career

Beginning of singing career (1992–1995)
Garg got his confidence to become a professional singer when he got gold medal for his western solo performance in youth festival held in 1992. And after this he entered into professional music with his debut Assamese album Anamika, which was released in 1992. His first composed song from this album was "Gaane Ki Aane" which he composed at the age of 13. Garg first recorded songs were "Tumi Junu Pariba Hun" and "Tumi Junaki Hubakh" for the album Ritu but was released in 1993. He released many other albums such as Xapunor Xur (1992), Junaki Mon (1993), Maya (1994), Asha (1995) etc. Before he moved to Mumbai in 1995, he released his first bihu album Ujan Piriti which was a commercial success.

Bollywood singing career (1995–present)
In the mid 1995, Garg moved to Mumbai to work in the Bollywood music industry where he debut his first Indipop solo album Chandni Raat. Later, he recorded few Hindi albums and remix songs like Chanda (1996), Shradhaanjali vol: 1,2,3 (1996-97), Jalwa (1998), Yuhi Kabhi (1998), Jadoo (1999), Sparsh (2000), etc. He got to sing for different films like Gaddaar (1995), Dil Se (1998), Doli Saja Ke Rakhna (1998), Fiza (2000), Kaante (2002). In 2003, he sung "Sapne Saare" and "khwabon Ki" from the movie Mudda-The Issue, "Mango Agar Dil Se Toh Khuda" from the movie Chupke Se, "Holi Re" from the movie Mumbai se Aiya Mera Dost and "Jo Pyar tumne" from the movie Jaal:The trap.

He got the biggest break in Bollywood from the movie Gangster where he sang the song "Ya ali". The song brought him the best playback singer Global Indian Film Awards (GIFA) in 2006. His next Hindi album Zindagi was released in 2007.

Bengali singing career
Apart from singing in his Bollywood and Assamese industries, he debuted in Bengali music industry in 2003 where he sung two songs in the movie Mon. In the next year he sung three songs in the movie Shudhu Tumi and also was the music director in the film.

In 2005 he sung "O bondhure" and "Lagena Bhalo" in the film  Premi. In 2008 he recorded songs like "Mon mane Na" from" the movie Mon Mane Na , "Piya re Piya re" from the movie Chirodini Tumi je Amaar, and "Mon jete chay shudhu" from the movie Love story.

Social work

Garg runs a charity, the Kalaguru Artiste Foundation, which donates money for various causes. He urged people to donate clothes, medicines and contributions when devastating floods hit Assam. He took on the issue over corruption in APSC recruitment in his movie Kanchanjangha.

He is a football fan and has played matches to collect funds for flood affected people.

Garg was one of the main non-political figure of the Anti-CAA protest in Assam.

Legacy

As a mark of respect and to celebrate the famous singer, a 20 feet tall statue has been set up. It was unveiled by the singer himself on 2nd December 2023 during the Nazirating Tamuli Tourism Festival in Digboi. Bamboo bridge built across the Na Dihing river by villagers of Tengapani and named after Zubeen Garg is inaugurated by the singer himself at Tengapani-Thepabari on 29th February 2020. 

Discography

As a music director

Films
Garg won the "Best Music Direction" for the film Echoes Of Silence in the 55th National Film Awards. He was nominated for the "Best Music Direction" for the film Dinabandhu in the 52nd National Film Awards.

Television

Theater

As a composer and lyricist

As an actor

Films
Garg played the lead role in Mon Jaai'', which won Best Feature Film in Assamese at 56th National Film Awards.

Television

As a director

Films

Theater

As a producer, script writer and poet

Producer

Script writer

As a poet
He got Seuji-Seuji award for his poetry book in 2017.

As a judge

Awards and honours

Zubeen Garg has received the following recognitions for his work in the industry.

Collaboration with musician and lyricist

See also
List of Indian playback singers
List of Indian male film actors
List of Indian film directors
List of Indian music directors

References

External links

 
 

1972 births
Living people
Assamese playback singers
Assamese-language singers
Bengali playback singers
Bengali-language singers
Bollywood playback singers
21st-century Indian male singers
21st-century Indian singers
Indian pop singers
Indian male singer-songwriters
Indian male pop singers
Indian male playback singers
Indian rock singers
Indian folk-pop singers
Indian male composers
People from Jorhat district
Performers of Hindu music
Singers from Assam
Singers from Guwahati
Singers from Meghalaya
Assamese-language film directors
Indian film score composers
Assamese actors
21st-century Indian film directors
21st-century Indian composers
Film directors from Assam
People from Meghalaya
 People from Tura, Meghalaya
People from Guwahati
Indian male film score composers
Assamese film score composers
Assamese-language lyricists